Stewart Town is a town that was established in Trelawny Parish, Jamaica in 1812. It was named after James Stewart, the Custos for Trelawney Parish 1800-1821.

References

Populated places in Trelawny Parish